Travel Time (in Seismology) means time for the seismic waves to travel from the focus of an earthquake through the crust to a certain seismograph station. Travel-time curve is a graph showing the relationship between the distance from the epicenter to the observation point and the travel time. Travel-time curve is drawn when the vertical axis of the graph is the travel time and the horizontal axis is the epicenter distance of each observation point. 

By examining the travel-time curve, it is possible to know the seismic wave velocity and the depth of the epicenter and so on. It also provides clues to study the layered structure inside the earth. For example, by examining the travel-time curve of a teleseism, it can be seen that the earth consists of the crust, mantle, outer core, and inner core. 

Travel-time curve also shows the relationship that the surface wave arrives first at the point near the epicenter, and conversely the refracted wave arrives first at the point far from the epicenter. 

Seismic waves usually travel at a constant speed, but the travel-time curve does not become a straight line, but always bends somewhere. The reason is that the speed at which seismic waves travel differs between the crust and the mantle. Seismic waves travel slowly in the crust, but conversely fast in the mantle. In other words, when the seismic wave reaches the Mohorovic discontinuity, the travel-time curve bends. Croatian seismologist Andrija Mohorovičić noticed from the travel-time curve of the 1909 earthquake that some seismic waves traveled faster than others, explaining this fact with a discontinuity in which the velocity of the P wave changes abruptly. This was later called the "Mohorovic discontinuity".

See also 

 Seismic wave
 Mohorovic discontinuity

References 

Seismology